This is a comprehensive listing of official releases by Kany García, a Puerto Rican Latin pop singer.

Discography

Studio albums

Live albums

Singles

Promotional singles

Featured singles

Music videos

References

Discographies of Puerto Rican artists
Latin pop music discographies